Saccharopolyspora gregorii is a bacterium from the genus Saccharopolyspora which has been isolated from fodder.

References

 

Pseudonocardineae
Bacteria described in 1989